Charles Kenneth Spears (March 12, 1938 – November 6, 2020) was an American animator, writer, television producer and sound editor. He was best known as a co-creator of the Scooby-Doo franchise, together with Joe Ruby. In 1977, they co-founded the television animation production company Ruby-Spears Productions.

Biography 
Spears was born on March 12, 1938, in Los Angeles but was also raised in New York City. His mother, Edna (née Graiver), died a month after he was born, while his father, Harry Spears, worked as a radio host and producer before joining a real estate business. Spears became a friend of the son of animation producer William Hanna while attending high school in California.

As an adult, shortly after leaving the United States Navy, Hanna hired Spears as a sound editor for Hanna-Barbera Productions in 1959. He met Joe Ruby, also ex-Navy, in the editing department of the studio, and the two men began a writing partnership. Spears and Ruby wrote gags and scripts for several animated and live-action television programs, both freelance and as on-staff writers for Hanna-Barbera, Sid and Marty Krofft Television Productions and DePatie–Freleng Enterprises.

For Hanna-Barbera, Spears and Ruby created the Scooby-Doo franchise and its main characters: Fred Jones, Daphne Blake, Velma Dinkley, Shaggy Rogers, and the eponymous title character. The original series, Scooby-Doo, Where Are You!, debuted on CBS in September 1969. After Fred Silverman, then head of daytime programming at CBS, concluded that, after about 15 drafts, a Great Dane was the star of the project, Spears and Ruby tried multiple ideas before settling on a cowardly dog who solves mysteries. For H-B, they also created Dynomutt, Dog Wonder, Captain Caveman and the Teen Angels, and Jabberjaw, among other programs. At DePatie–Freleng, they created The Barkleys and The Houndcats. In the early 1970s, Silverman hired Spears and Ruby to supervise the production of CBS's Saturday morning cartoon lineup, a position they assumed at ABC when Silverman defected to that network.

Wanting to create competition for Hanna-Barbera, ABC set Ruby and Spears up with their own studio in 1977, as a subsidiary of Filmways. Ruby-Spears Productions produced further animated series for Saturday morning, among them Fangface (a group of teenagers again, but including a werewolf), The Plastic Man Comedy-Adventure Hour, Thundarr the Barbarian, Saturday Supercade, Mister T, Alvin and the Chipmunks, and Superman, among others. Ruby-Spears was bought by Hanna-Barbera's parent company, Taft Entertainment, in 1981, and its back catalog was sold along with the Hanna-Barbera library and studio in 1991 to Turner Broadcasting. Current reissues of Ruby-Spears shows on DVD and digital platforms are therefore copyrighted by Hanna-Barbera Productions.

Spears died of complications from Lewy body dementia at his home in Brea, California, on November 6, 2020, at the age of 82. Prior to his death, he had continued to work with Ruby on the production and development of animated series until Ruby's death on August 26, 2020. Ruby had been in hospice care for two years prior to his death. It is unknown how often they had worked together in those two years.

References

External links 

 

1938 births
2020 deaths
American male television writers
Television producers from California
American animated film producers
Hanna-Barbera people
Writers from Los Angeles
Deaths from dementia in California
Deaths from Lewy body dementia
Ruby-Spears
Burials at Oakwood Memorial Park Cemetery